Hartley Rogers Jr. (July 6, 1926 – July 17, 2015) was a mathematician who worked in computability theory, and was a professor in the Mathematics Department of the Massachusetts Institute of Technology.

Biography
Born in 1926 in Buffalo, New York, he studied under Alonzo Church at Princeton, and received his Ph.D. there in 1952.  He served on the MIT faculty from 1956 until his death, July 17, 2015. He is survived by his wife, Dr. Adrianne E. Rogers, by his three children, Hartley R. Rogers, Campbell D.K. Rogers, and Caroline R. Broderick, and by his 10 grandchildren.

At MIT he had been involved in many scholarly extracurricular activities, including running SPUR (Summer Program in Undergraduate Research) for MIT undergraduates, overseeing the mathematics section of RSI (Research Science Institute) for advanced high school students, and coaching the MIT Putnam exam team for nearly two decades starting in 1990, including the years 2003 and 2004 when MIT won for the first time since 1979. He also ran a seminar called 18.S34: Mathematical Problem Solving for MIT freshmen.

Rogers is known within the MIT undergraduate community also for having developed a multivariable calculus course (18.022: Multivariable Calculus with Theory) with the explicit goal of providing a firm mathematical foundation for the study of physics. In 2005 he announced that he would no longer be teaching the course himself, but it is likely that it will continue to be taught in a similar manner in the future. He is remembered for his witty mathematical comments during lectures as well as his tradition of awarding Leibniz Cookies and Fig Newtons to top performers in his class.

An avid oarsman, he was most recently a member of the Cambridge Boat Club on the Charles River, Cambridge, Massachusetts. In his spare time, he served for many years as the Chaplain for the World Indoor Rowing Championships as part of the C.R.A.S.H.-B. Sprints Board of Directors.

Mathematical work
Rogers worked in mathematical logic, particularly recursion theory, and wrote the classic text Theory of Recursive Functions and Effective Computability. The Rogers equivalence theorem is named after him.

His doctoral students included Patrick Fischer, Louis Hodes, Carl Jockusch, Andrew Kahr, David Luckham, Rohit Parikh, David Park, and John Stillwell.

Rogers won the Lester R. Ford Award in 1965 for his expository article Information Theory.

Selected works
 
 
 
 Hartley Rogers Jr., The Theory of Recursive Functions and Effective Computability, MIT Press,  (paperback),  (textbook)

References

External links 
 

1926 births
2015 deaths
20th-century American mathematicians
21st-century American mathematicians
American logicians
Princeton University alumni
Massachusetts Institute of Technology School of Science  faculty
Logicians
People from Winchester, Massachusetts